The 2012 Diamond Head Classic was a mid-season eight-team college basketball tournament played on December 22, 23, and 25 at the Stan Sheriff Center in Honolulu, Hawaii. It was the fourth annual Diamond Head Classic tournament and was part of the 2012–13 NCAA Division I men's basketball season. No. 3-ranked Arizona defeated No. 17-ranked San Diego State to win the tournament championship. Solomon Hill was named the tournament's MVP.

Bracket
* – Denotes overtime period

Source

All-tournament team

Source

References

Diamond Head Classic
Diamond Head Classic
2012 in sports in Hawaii